Uzoma Nwaozuzu Nwachukwu commonly known as Kiliwi Nwachukwu, Killiwi Nwachukwu or Killiwe Nwachukwu was a Nigerian fighter of Igbo descent. Although there are speculation that he is a myth.

Life 
Nwachukwu was born in 1931 in Mbaitolu in today's Imo state. He was known for his eronomous strength which earned him the name "Killi-we". He married six wives and dead in 30 October 1992.

References 

1931 births
1992 deaths